Julius Adler may refer to:
 Julius Adler (biochemist) (born 1930), American biochemist
Julius Adler (actor) (1906–1994), Polish-born American Yiddish theater actor
Julius Ochs Adler (1892–1955), American publisher, journalist, and US Army general
Julius Adler (politician) (1894–1945), Communist Member of the IV. German Reichstag (Weimar Republic)